Alicia Rosa Maguiña Málaga (28 November 1938 – 14 September 2020) was a Peruvian composer and singer linked to Peruvian waltz music. Her song Indio is said to express her solidarity with indigenous Peruvians and their suffering.

References

External links
 

Peruvian singer-songwriters
20th-century Peruvian women singers
20th-century Peruvian singers
Peruvian composers
Singers from Lima
1938 births
2020 deaths
20th-century composers
20th-century women composers
Women singer-songwriters